The West Point Historic District in West Point, Kentucky is a  historic district which was listed on the National Register of Historic Places in 1996.

The district is roughly bounded by the Salt River, 2nd, South, 13th, Mulberry, and Elm Sts. and dates from 1829.

It includes 75 contributing buildings as well as 62 non-contributing buildings and one contributing object.  Six properties were already separately NRHP listed.  Resources include:
James Young House, separately NRHP-listed
Ditto-Prewitt House, (1826) separately NRHP-listed
Applegate-Fisher House, separately NRHP-listed
Kentucky and Indiana Bank (c.1901), separately NRHP-listed
Abraham Ditto House (c.1840), separately NRHP-listed
Hardy Hotel/West Point Hotel (1902), separately NRHP-listed

The listing was consistent with guidelines established in a 1986 study of historic resources in Hardin County.

References

Historic districts on the National Register of Historic Places in Kentucky
Federal architecture in Kentucky
Queen Anne architecture in Kentucky
Buildings and structures completed in 1829
National Register of Historic Places in Hardin County, Kentucky